Sci-Fi Valley Con (formerly Sci-Fi in the Valley Con) is an annual three day multi-genre convention held during June at the Blair County Convention Center in Altoona, Pennsylvania.

Programming
The convention typically offers board gaming, charity auction, costume contest, film festival, guest panels, role-playing gaming, table-top gaming, trivia tournaments, vendors, video gaming, and workshops. The 2012 charity auction raised $1200 for The Machine Gun Preacher's Save the Children Foundation. 2013's charity auction benefited Shriners Hospitals for Children and raised almost $1500.

History
Sci-Fi in the Valley Con 2012 was moved from the Cambria County War Memorial Arena in Johnstown, Pennsylvania to the North Central Recreation Center in Ebensburg, Pennsylvania. This occurred due to a local fee that would affect the conventions dealers. In 2013, the convention moved to the Jaffa Shrine and used the bottom floor. It used both of the Jaffa's floors in 2014. The convention used half of the Blair County Convention Center in 2015, and the whole facility in 2016. Sci-Fi Valley Con 2020 was moved from June to August due to the COVID-19 pandemic, and later cancelled. Sci-Fi Valley Con 2021 was moved from June to October due to the COVID-19 pandemic.

Event history

See also
Setsucon

References

Other Related News Articles
Your Town: Sci-Fi Valley Con WJAC, Retrieved 2020-03-25 
Sci-Fi Valley Con 2019 kicks off in Altoona WJAC, Retrieved 2020-03-25

External links
 Official website

Multigenre conventions
Science fiction conventions in the United States
Recurring events established in 2012
2012 establishments in Pennsylvania
Annual events in Pennsylvania
Festivals in Pennsylvania
Pennsylvania culture
Tourist attractions in Blair County, Pennsylvania
Conventions in Pennsylvania